In mathematics, the Laplace transform, named after its discoverer Pierre-Simon Laplace, is an integral transform that converts a function of a real variable (usually , in the time domain) to a function of a complex variable  (in the complex frequency domain, also known as s-domain, or s-plane). The transform has many applications in science and engineering because it is a tool for solving differential equations. In particular, it transforms ordinary differential equations into algebraic equations and convolution into multiplication.
For suitable functions f, the Laplace transform is the integral

History 

The Laplace transform is named after mathematician and astronomer Pierre-Simon, marquis de Laplace, who used a similar transform in his work on probability theory. Laplace wrote extensively about the use of generating functions in Essai philosophique sur les probabilités (1814), and the integral form of the Laplace transform evolved naturally as a result.

Laplace's use of generating functions was similar to what is now known as the z-transform, and he gave little attention to the continuous variable case which was discussed by Niels Henrik Abel. The theory was further developed in the 19th and early 20th centuries by Mathias Lerch, Oliver Heaviside, and Thomas Bromwich.

The current widespread use of the transform (mainly in engineering) came about during and soon after World War II, replacing the earlier Heaviside operational calculus. The advantages of the Laplace transform had been emphasized by Gustav Doetsch, to whom the name Laplace transform is apparently due.

From 1744, Leonhard Euler investigated integrals of the form

as solutions of differential equations, but did not pursue the matter very far. Joseph-Louis Lagrange was an admirer of Euler and, in his work on integrating probability density functions, investigated expressions of the form

which some modern historians have interpreted within modern Laplace transform theory.

These types of integrals seem first to have attracted Laplace's attention in 1782, where he was following in the spirit of Euler in using the integrals themselves as solutions of equations. However, in 1785, Laplace took the critical step forward when, rather than simply looking for a solution in the form of an integral, he started to apply the transforms in the sense that was later to become popular. He used an integral of the form

akin to a Mellin transform, to transform the whole of a difference equation, in order to look for solutions of the transformed equation. He then went on to apply the Laplace transform in the same way and started to derive some of its properties, beginning to appreciate its potential power.

Laplace also recognised that Joseph Fourier's method of Fourier series for solving the diffusion equation could only apply to a limited region of space, because those solutions were periodic. In 1809, Laplace applied his transform to find solutions that diffused indefinitely in space.

Formal definition 
The Laplace transform of a function , defined for all real numbers , is the function , which is a unilateral transform defined by

where s is a complex frequency domain parameter

The meaning of the integral depends on types of functions of interest. For locally integrable functions that decay at infinity or are of exponential type, the integral can be understood to be a (proper) Lebesgue integral. Still more generally, the integral can be understood in a weak sense, and this is dealt with below.

One can define the Laplace transform of a finite Borel measure  by the Lebesgue integral

An important special case is where  is a probability measure, for example, the Dirac delta function. In operational calculus, the Laplace transform of a measure is often treated as though the measure came from a probability density function .  In that case, to avoid potential confusion, one often writes

Although with the Lebesgue integral, it is not necessary to take such a limit, it does appear more naturally in connection with the Laplace–Stieltjes transform.

Bilateral Laplace transform 

When one says "the Laplace transform" without qualification, the unilateral or one-sided transform is usually intended. The Laplace transform can be alternatively defined as the bilateral Laplace transform, or two-sided Laplace transform, by extending the limits of integration to be the entire real axis. If that is done, the common unilateral transform simply becomes a special case of the bilateral transform, where the definition of the function being transformed is multiplied by the Heaviside step function.

The bilateral Laplace transform  is defined as follows:

Inverse Laplace transform 

Two integrable functions have the same Laplace transform only if they differ on a set of Lebesgue measure zero. This means that, on the range of the transform, there is an inverse transform. In fact, besides integrable functions, the Laplace transform is a one-to-one mapping from one function space into another in many other function spaces as well, although there is usually no easy characterization of the range.

The Laplace transform is also defined and injective for suitable spaces of tempered distributions.

In these cases, the image of the Laplace transform lives in a space of analytic functions in the region of convergence.  The inverse Laplace transform is given by the following complex integral, which is known by various names (the Bromwich integral, the Fourier–Mellin integral, and Mellin's inverse formula):

In most applications, the contour can be closed, allowing the use of the residue theorem. An alternative formula for the inverse Laplace transform is given by Post's inversion formula. The limit here is interpreted in the weak-* topology.

In practice, it is typically more convenient to decompose a Laplace transform into known transforms of functions obtained from a table, and construct the inverse by inspection.

Probability theory 
In pure and applied probability, the Laplace transform is defined as an expected value.

By convention, this is referred to as the Laplace transform of the random variable  itself. The Laplace transform has applications throughout probability theory, including first passage times of stochastic processes such as Markov chains, and renewal theory.

Of particular use is the ability to recover the cumulative distribution function of a continuous random variable , by means of the Laplace transform as follows:

Region of convergence 
If  is a locally integrable function (or more generally a Borel measure locally of bounded variation), then the Laplace transform  of  converges provided that the limit

exists.

The Laplace transform converges absolutely if the integral

exists as a proper Lebesgue integral. The Laplace transform is usually understood as conditionally convergent, meaning that it converges in the former but not in the latter sense.

In the two-sided case, it is sometimes called the strip of absolute convergence. The Laplace transform is analytic in the region of absolute convergence: this is a consequence of Fubini's theorem and Morera's theorem.

Similarly, the set of values for which  converges (conditionally or absolutely) is known as the region of conditional convergence, or simply the region of convergence (ROC). Therefore, the region of convergence is a half-plane of the form , possibly including some points of the boundary line .

In the region of convergence , the Laplace transform of  can be expressed by integrating by parts as the integral

That is,  can effectively be expressed, in the region of convergence, as the absolutely convergent Laplace transform of some other function.  In particular, it is analytic.

In engineering applications, a function corresponding to a linear time-invariant (LTI) system is stable if every bounded input produces a bounded output. This is equivalent to the absolute convergence of the Laplace transform of the impulse response function in the region . As a result, LTI systems are stable, provided that the poles of the Laplace transform of the impulse response function have negative real part.

This ROC is used in knowing about the causality and stability of a system.

Properties and theorems 
The Laplace transform has a number of properties that make it useful for analyzing linear dynamical systems.

Because of this property, the Laplace variable  is also known as operator variable in the  domain: either derivative operator or (for  integration operator. The transform turns integral equations and differential equations to polynomial equations, which are much easier to solve. Once solved, use of the inverse Laplace transform reverts to the original domain.

the following table is a list of properties of unilateral Laplace transform:

 Initial value theorem

 Final value theorem
The final value theorem is useful because it gives the long-term behaviour without having to perform partial fraction decompositions (or other difficult algebra). If  has a pole in the right-hand plane or poles on the imaginary axis (e.g., if  or ), then the behaviour of this formula is undefined.

Relation to power series 
The Laplace transform can be viewed as a continuous analogue of a power series.

where  is a real variable (see Z-transform).

where the discrete function  is replaced by the continuous one .

For this to converge for, say, all bounded functions , it is necessary to require that . Making the substitution  gives just the Laplace transform:

Relation to moments 

The quantities

are the moments of the function .  If the first  moments of  converge absolutely, then by repeated differentiation under the integral, 

This is of special significance in probability theory, where the moments of a random variable  are given by the expectation values .  Then, the relation holds

Computation of the Laplace transform of a function's derivative 
It is often convenient to use the differentiation property of the Laplace transform to find the transform of a function's derivative. This can be derived from the basic expression for a Laplace transform as follows:

yielding

and in the bilateral case,

The general result

Evaluating integrals over the positive real axis 
A useful property of the Laplace transform is the following:

The above formula is a variation of integration by parts, with the operators 
Let us prove the equivalent formulation:

By plugging in  the left-hand side turns into:

but assuming Fubini's theorem holds, by reversing the order of integration we get the wanted right-hand side.

This method can be used to compute integrals that would otherwise be difficult to compute using elementary methods of real calculus. For example,

Relationship to other transforms

Laplace–Stieltjes transform 
The (unilateral) Laplace–Stieltjes transform of a function  is defined by the Lebesgue–Stieltjes integral

The function  is assumed to be of bounded variation.  If  is the antiderivative of :

So in practice, the only distinction between the two transforms is that the Laplace transform is thought of as operating on the density function of the measure, whereas the Laplace–Stieltjes transform is thought of as operating on its cumulative distribution function.

Fourier transform 

The Fourier transform is a special case (under certain conditions) of the bilateral Laplace transform. While the Fourier transform of a function is a complex function of a real variable (frequency), the Laplace transform of a function is a complex function of a complex variable. A consequence of this restriction is that the Laplace transform of a function is a holomorphic function of the variable . Unlike the Fourier transform, the Laplace transform of a distribution is generally a well-behaved function. Techniques of complex variables can also be used to directly study Laplace transforms. As a holomorphic function, the Laplace transform has a power series representation. This power series expresses a function as a linear superposition of moments of the function. This perspective has applications in probability theory.

The Fourier transform is equivalent to evaluating the bilateral Laplace transform with imaginary argument  or  when the condition explained below is fulfilled,

This relationship between the Laplace and Fourier transforms is often used to determine the frequency spectrum of a signal or dynamical system.

The above relation is valid as stated if and only if the region of convergence (ROC) of  contains the imaginary axis, .

However, a relation of the form

holds under much weaker conditions. For instance, this holds for the above example provided that the limit is understood as a weak limit of measures (see vague topology). General conditions relating the limit of the Laplace transform of a function on the boundary to the Fourier transform take the form of Paley–Wiener theorems.

Mellin transform 

The Mellin transform and its inverse are related to the two-sided Laplace transform by a simple change of variables.

If in the Mellin transform

we set  we get a two-sided Laplace transform.

Z-transform 

The unilateral or one-sided Z-transform is simply the Laplace transform of an ideally sampled signal with the substitution of

Let

be a sampling impulse train (also called a Dirac comb) and

be the sampled representation of the continuous-time 

The Laplace transform of the sampled signal  is

This is the precise definition of the unilateral Z-transform of the discrete function 

Comparing the last two equations, we find the relationship between the unilateral Z-transform and the Laplace transform of the sampled signal,

The similarity between the Z- and Laplace transforms is expanded upon in the theory of time scale calculus.

Borel transform 
The integral form of the Borel transform

is a special case of the Laplace transform for  an entire function of exponential type, meaning that

The generalized Borel transform allows a different weighting function to be used, rather than the exponential function, to transform functions not of exponential type. Nachbin's theorem gives necessary and sufficient conditions for the Borel transform to be well defined.

Fundamental relationships 
Since an ordinary Laplace transform can be written as a special case of a two-sided transform, and since the two-sided transform can be written as the sum of two one-sided transforms, the theory of the Laplace-, Fourier-, Mellin-, and Z-transforms are at bottom the same subject. However, a different point of view and different characteristic problems are associated with each of these four major integral transforms.

Table of selected Laplace transforms 

The following table provides Laplace transforms for many common functions of a single variable. For definitions and explanations, see the Explanatory Notes at the end of the table.

Because the Laplace transform is a linear operator,
 The Laplace transform of a sum is the sum of Laplace transforms of each term.
 The Laplace transform of a multiple of a function is that multiple times the Laplace transformation of that function.

Using this linearity, and various trigonometric, hyperbolic, and complex number (etc.) properties and/or identities, some Laplace transforms can be obtained from others more quickly than by using the definition directly.

The unilateral Laplace transform takes as input a function whose time domain is the non-negative reals, which is why all of the time domain functions in the table below are multiples of the Heaviside step function, .

The entries of the table that involve a time delay  are required to be causal (meaning that ). In general, the region of convergence for causal systems is not the same as that of anticausal systems.

s-domain equivalent circuits and impedances 
The Laplace transform is often used in circuit analysis, and simple conversions to the -domain of circuit elements can be made. Circuit elements can be transformed into impedances, very similar to phasor impedances.

Here is a summary of equivalents:

 

Note that the resistor is exactly the same in the time domain and the -domain. The sources are put in if there are initial conditions on the circuit elements. For example, if a capacitor has an initial voltage across it, or if the inductor has an initial current through it, the sources inserted in the -domain account for that.

The equivalents for current and voltage sources are simply derived from the transformations in the table above.

Examples and applications 

The Laplace transform is used frequently in engineering and physics; the output of a linear time-invariant system can be calculated by convolving its unit impulse response with the input signal. Performing this calculation in Laplace space turns the convolution into a multiplication; the latter being easier to solve because of its algebraic form. For more information, see control theory. The Laplace transform is invertible on a large class of functions.  Given a simple mathematical or functional description of an input or output to a system, the Laplace transform provides an alternative functional description that often simplifies the process of analyzing the behavior of the system, or in synthesizing a new system based on a set of specifications.

The Laplace transform can also be used to solve differential equations and is used extensively in mechanical engineering and electrical engineering.  The Laplace transform reduces a linear differential equation to an algebraic equation, which can then be solved by the formal rules of algebra.  The original differential equation can then be solved by applying the inverse Laplace transform. English electrical engineer Oliver Heaviside first proposed a similar scheme, although without using the Laplace transform; and the resulting operational calculus is credited as the Heaviside calculus.

Evaluating improper integrals 
Let . Then (see the table above)

In the limit , one gets

provided that the interchange of limits can be justified. This is often possible as a consequence of the final value theorem. Even when the interchange cannot be justified the calculation can be suggestive.

The validity of this identity can be proved by other means. It is an example of a Frullani integral.

Another example is Dirichlet integral.

Complex impedance of a capacitor 
In the theory of electrical circuits, the current flow in a capacitor is proportional to the capacitance and rate of change in the electrical potential (with equations as for the SI unit system). Symbolically, this is expressed by the differential equation

Taking the Laplace transform of this equation, we obtain

where

and

Solving for  we have

The definition of the complex impedance  (in ohms) is the ratio of the complex voltage  divided by the complex current  while holding the initial state  at zero:

Using this definition and the previous equation, we find:

which is the correct expression for the complex impedance of a capacitor. In addition, the Laplace transform has large applications in control theory.

Partial fraction expansion 

Consider a linear time-invariant system with transfer function

The impulse response is simply the inverse Laplace transform of this transfer function:

To evaluate this inverse transform, we begin by expanding  using the method of partial fraction expansion,

Each residue represents the relative contribution of that singularity to the transfer function's overall shape.

By the residue theorem, the inverse Laplace transform depends only upon the poles and their residues.

Then by letting , the contribution from  vanishes and all that is left is

Similarly, the residue  is given by

Note that

which is the impulse response of the system.

Convolution
That is, the inverse of

is

Phase delay 

Starting with the Laplace transform,

we find the inverse by first rearranging terms in the fraction:

We are now able to take the inverse Laplace transform of our terms:

This is just the sine of the sum of the arguments, yielding:

We can apply similar logic to find that

Statistical mechanics 
In statistical mechanics, the Laplace transform of the density of states  defines the partition function. That is, the canonical partition function  is given by

and the inverse is given by

Spatial (not time) structure from astronomical spectrum
The wide and general applicability of the Laplace transform and its inverse is illustrated by an application in astronomy which provides some information on the spatial distribution of matter of an astronomical source of radiofrequency thermal radiation too distant to resolve as more than a point, given its flux density spectrum, rather than relating the time domain with the spectrum (frequency domain).

Assuming certain properties of the object, e.g. spherical shape and constant temperature, calculations based on carrying out an inverse Laplace transformation on the spectrum of the object can produce the only possible model of the distribution of matter in it (density as a function of distance from the center) consistent with the spectrum. When independent information on the structure of an object is available, the inverse Laplace transform method has been found to be in good agreement.

Gallery

See also 

 Analog signal processing
 Bernstein's theorem on monotone functions
 Continuous-repayment mortgage
 Hamburger moment problem
 Hardy–Littlewood Tauberian theorem
 Laplace–Carson transform
 Moment-generating function
 Nonlocal operator
 Post's inversion formula
 Signal-flow graph

Notes

References

Modern

Historical 

 
 
 , Chapters 3–5

Further reading
 .
 
 
 
 
 Mathews, Jon; Walker, Robert L. (1970), Mathematical methods of physics (2nd ed.), New York: W. A. Benjamin, 
 
 
  - See Chapter VI. The Laplace transform.
 
 
 J.A.C.Weidman and Bengt Fornberg: "Fully numerical Laplace transform methods", Numerical Algorithms, vol.92 (2023), pp.985-1006. https://doi.org/10.1007/s11075-022-01368-x .

External links 

 
 Online Computation of the transform or inverse transform, wims.unice.fr
 Tables of Integral Transforms at EqWorld: The World of Mathematical Equations.
 
 Good explanations of the initial and final value theorems 
 Laplace Transforms at MathPages
 Computational Knowledge Engine allows to easily calculate Laplace Transforms and its inverse Transform.
 Laplace Calculator to calculate Laplace Transforms online easily.
 Code to visualize Laplace Transforms and many example videos.

 
Differential equations
Fourier analysis
Mathematical physics
Integral transforms